Dmitry Timofeevich Lensky real name D. T. Vorobyov (Moscow, 1805–1860), was a Russian comic actor and author of vaudevilles.

Lensky debuted as an actor at the Maly Theatre in 1824, but found success as a writer of vaudeville acts.

References

1805 births
1860 deaths
Russian male comedians
Russian dramatists and playwrights
Russian male dramatists and playwrights
Russian male actors
19th-century dramatists and playwrights from the Russian Empire
19th-century male actors from the Russian Empire
19th-century male writers from the Russian Empire
19th-century pseudonymous writers